Jamie McDell (born 3 November 1992) is a New Zealand musician and singer-songwriter. She was discovered at the age of 16 by EMI Music New Zealand after sending them a demo tape of her acoustic original music. Prior to being signed by a major record label, McDell used various social media outlets to gain exposure, posting YouTube videos – including original songs and cover songs, Twitter and Facebook to get her music out to the masses.

She released her debut single, "You'll Never Take That Away", on 20 February 2012, which was certified Gold in New Zealand. Following the success of her debut single, McDell released her EP, All That I Wanted – Acoustic EP, on 4 May 2012. Her second single, "Rewind" was released on 13 June 2012. McDell's debut studio album, Six Strings and a Sailboat, was released 16 November 2012 and was certified Gold in New Zealand.

Ask Me Anything, McDell's second studio album, was released 27 March 2015.

McDell's third studio album, Extraordinary Girl, was released on 4 May 2018, independently released and recorded at House of Blues, Studio D, Nashville Tennessee. The album featured various country musicians such as Kasey Chambers, Bill Chambers and Tami Neilson.

Early life and career
Jamie McDell was born in Auckland and brought up in a musical family, with a passion for singing and music. Her father Terry McDell, a New Zealand sailing champion (1972 Yachtsman of the Year) decided the family would live aboard a yacht in the Mediterranean when Jamie was seven years of age. She was introduced to the music of Jimmy Buffett and John Denver and learnt to play the guitar by watching her parents perform these songs on the boat.

Jamie McDell on songwriting:

2012–present: Six Strings and a Sailboat
McDell's single, "You'll Never Take That Away", was released to the New Zealand market on 20 February 2012. It was successful on the Official New Zealand Top 40, entering and debuting on the chart at No. 27 on 2 April 2012. The single climbed to No. 11 and spent a total of ten weeks on the chart. The single topped the Top 20 New Zealand Singles chart (which features singles by New Zealand artists) on 30 April 2012, holding the top position for four consecutive weeks. The single was certified Gold on 28 May 2012.

Following the success of her debut single, McDell released a 5-track EP, All That I Wanted – Acoustic EP, featuring acoustic renditions of "You'll Never Take That Away", "Rewind" and three other original songs. It was released via EMI Music New Zealand on 4 May 2012.

Her second single, "Rewind", was released 13 July 2012. It peaked at number 30 on the New Zealand singles chart. Her third single, "Life in Sunshine", was released 12 October 2012. It peaked at number 27 on the New Zealand singles chart.

McDell entered the studio to begin recording her debut studio album in August 2012. The cover art, release date and title for the album, Six Strings and a Sailboat, were revealed on her official Facebook page. The album was released 16 November 2012. It peaked at No. 8 on the New Zealand albums chart. An instrumental version of the album was released on 11 January 2013 on the iTunes Store.

Her fourth single, "Angel", was released 1 February 2013.

She wrote a song called "Ode to the Lines" for Global Citizen. It was released on 26 July 2013 on the iTunes Store with all proceeds going towards helping those living in extreme poverty. She performed "Ode to the Lines" with Anika Moa at the Global Citizen Concert, held at the Auckland Town Hall on 4 August 2013.

Though Jamie began her music career in the commercial Pop music world, she became an independent artist in 2016 and decided to pursue her dream of recording in Nashville. In late 2017 Jamie travelled to Nashville to record an album, solely written by her, with award-winning Australian producer Nash Chambers.

She was named 2018 Top Female Artist by the Variety Artists Club of New Zealand at the 2018 Benny Awards.

Discography

Studio albums

Notes

Extended plays

Singles

Charity singles

Music videos

Awards and nominations

References

External links

New Zealand women singer-songwriters
People from Auckland
Living people
1992 births
21st-century New Zealand women singers
New Zealand country singers
New Zealand country guitarists
New Zealand alternative country musicians